Rashed Al Hajri (Arabic:راشد الهاجري) (born 25 April 1995) is an Emirati footballer. He currently plays as a forward.

External links

References

Emirati footballers
1995 births
Living people
Al-Shaab CSC players
Al-Wasl F.C. players
Ajman Club players
UAE First Division League players
UAE Pro League players
Association football forwards